Backwardness brings on beatings by others, or the backward will be beaten up, backwardness proves vulnerable to attack,  is a viewpoint initially put forward by Joseph Stalin in his speech On the Tasks of Economic Workers, delivered on February 4, 1931. This claim attributes China's beating to its technological backwardness. It is a slogan used by the Chinese government to "guide" Chinese people to understand the modern Chinese history.

Definition
"Backwardness brings on beatings by others" literally means that if you are backward, you will be beaten. This phrase is mostly for countries, it implies that backward countries are naturally subject to invasion and exploitation.

Evaluations
Some Chinese scholars have questioned the statement that "backwardness brings on beatings by others". Zhu Weizheng argued that the backwardness of political civilization was the fundamental reason why the late Qing China was beaten by the Western powers.  According to Hu Haiou, the real reason why the late Qing China was beaten was because of its backward concept.

References 

1931 in China
Chinese words and phrases
Ideology of the Chinese Communist Party